The 2014 South Dakota State Jackrabbits football team represented South Dakota State University in the 2014 NCAA Division I FCS football season. They are led by 17th-year head coach John Stiegelmeier and played their home games at Coughlin–Alumni Stadium. They were a member of the Missouri Valley Football Conference. They finished the season 9–5, 5–3 in MVFC play to finish in fourth place. They were invited to the FCS Playoffs where they defeated Montana State in the first round before losing in the second round to fellow MVFC member North Dakota State.

Schedule

Ranking movements

References

South Dakota State
South Dakota State Jackrabbits football seasons
South Dakota State
South Dakota State Jackrabbits football